Prefectural elections for the Tokyo Metropolitan Assembly (令和3年/2021年東京都議会議員選挙, Reiwa 3-nen/2021-nen Tōkyō togikai giin senkyo, "Reiwa 3/2021 election of members of the Tokyo Metropolitan Assembly") were held on 4 July 2021. The 127 members were elected in forty-two electoral districts, seven returning single members elected by first-past-the-post, and thirty-five returning multiple members under single non-transferable vote. Two districts had their magnitude adjusted in this election to match population changes.

The results of the election saw the ruling Liberal Democratic Party (LDP) winning the most seats, displacing the regional party Tomin First no Kai to become the largest party in the Assembly. However the coalition of the LDP and their partner Komeito failed to win an outright majority of seats in what was widely described as a poor result for the LDP and Prime Minister Yoshihide Suga.

Background 
Yuriko Koike won the 2016 Tokyo gubernatorial election as an independent candidate, and left the LDP in June 2017 to found a new local political party, Tomin First, which won a majority in the 2017 Tokyo prefectural election along with its coalition partner, Komeito. Koike was since re-elected in the 2020 gubernatorial election.

Komeito had since announced that it would leave its coalition with Tomin First in the Metropolitan Assembly, instead seeking to enter into a governing coalition with the Liberal Democratic Party (both parties make up the ruling coalition in the National Diet). Koike was hospitalized on 22 June 2021 due to severe fatigue, however she was discharged on 30 June and made surprise appearances on 3 July, the final day of campaigning, to campaign in support of Tomin First candidates in various districts across central Tokyo.

The election had been described as a potential bellwether for the upcoming general election.

Electoral districts 

Most districts are coterminous with a municipality (-ku/-shi/-chō/-son) of the same name. The following districts comprise multiple municipalities:
 Nishi-Tama ("West Tama“; follows the original boundaries of the district of the same name, except Ōme): Fussa, Hamura, Akiruno, Hinohara, Hinode, Mizuho, Okutama
 Minami-Tama ("South Tama“; follows the boundaries of the former district of the same name): Tama, Inagi
 Kita-Tama dai-1 ("North Tama #1“; follows the boundaries of the former Kitatama district): Higashi-Murayama, Higashi-Yamato, Musashi-Murayama
 Kita-Tama dai-2 ("North Tama #2“): Kokubunji, Kunitachi
 Kita-Tama dai-3 ("North Tama #3“): Chōfu, Komae
 Kita-Tama dai-4 ("North Tama #4“): Kiyose, Higashi-Kurume
 Islands: Aogashima, Hachijō, Mikurajima, Miyake, Ogasawara, Kōzushima, Niijima, Ōshima, Toshima

Candidates

Results

The ruling Liberal Democratic Party (LDP) won the most seats in the election, displacing the regional party Tomin First no Kai as the largest party in the Assembly, while the LDP's coalition partner Komeito maintained their 23 seats for the sixth election in a row. However the LDP/Komeito coalition failed to win an outright majority of seats, an outcome which was widely described as a poor showing for the LDP and a manifestation of public dissatisfaction with Prime Minister Yoshihide Suga's handling of the COVID-19 pandemic and the delayed 2020 Olympic Games.

Tomin First lost 15 seats, becoming the second largest party in the Assembly, however this was described as a better than expected result for the party as most polls and forecasts prior to the election projected the party losing far more seats. Some analysts attributed Tomin First's unexpectedly strong result to the continuing popularity of Tokyo Governor Yuriko Koike, whose policies and personal image form the backbone of the party's appeal, despite Koike no longer serving as the leader of the party.

The newly organized centre-left opposition Constitutional Democratic Party gained eight seats while the Japanese Communist Party gained one, in what some analysts described as an indication of energized opposition to the LDP. The regional Tokyo Seikatsusha Network and Osaka-based centre-right  Nippon Ishin no Kai both maintained one seat each in the Assembly. The centre to centre-right Democratic Party for the People and the left-wing populist party Reiwa Shinsengumi both contested the Assembly for the first time, however neither party won any seats.

Opinion polling

See also
 2020 Tokyo gubernatorial election

Notes

References 

2021 in Tokyo
Tokyo prefectural elections
July 2021 events in Japan
2021 elections in Japan